Vought News Network: Seven on 7 with Cameron Coleman (also known as Seven on 7 on VNN [Vought News Network], or simply Seven on 7) is an American faux current affairs digital series serving as the center of several viral marketing campaigns created by Amazon Prime Video for their streaming television series The Boys. Directed by Matt Motschenbacher, and based on the fictional Vought News Network (VNN)—a parody of the Cable News Network (CNN) as well as Fox News—the YouTube videos initially began as marketing for The Boys—developed by Eric Kripke—and resulting cinematic universe media franchise—an adaptation of the DC-WildStorm/Dynamite Entertainment comic series of the same name by Garth Ennis and Darick Robertson—and deal with major events between the events of the second and third seasons of the series, and later the spin-off Gen V.

The first season of the news program is presented by Matthew Edison as Cameron Coleman—a parody of Tucker Carlson and J. K. Simmons' Marvel Cinematic Universe (MCU) portrayal of J. Jonah Jameson—who later reprised his role from the series in the third season of The Boys. Several actors reprise their roles from the television series in faux interview and corporate advertising campaign segments, while archival footage and imagery of others is also used. The initial videos were released from July to December 2021, focusing on the immediate aftermath of the second season of The Boys leading up to the third season and Gen V spin-off, following the former season's production delay due to the COVID-19 pandemic. Following a shortened second season, a third season leading up to the events of the fourth season of The Boys and Gen V entered active development.

The videos are accompanied by additional marketing materials, such as in-universe web articles and social media posts. The series was positively received, seen as better than average viral marketing campaigns, and as a fun and insightful expansion of The Boys franchise for fans of it.

Aftermath of The Boys Season Two campaign (2021–2022)

The Boys Season Three campaign (2022)

Gen V campaign (2022)

Cast and characters
 Matthew Edison as Cameron Coleman, the presenter of The Cameron Coleman Show and the monthly Seven on 7 with Cameron Coleman, who spouts rhetoric in favour of Vought International and its various superhero franchises. Edison later reprised the role in a recurring capacity in the third season of The Boys.

Reprising their roles from The Boys streaming television series are Claudia Doumit as Victoria "Vic" Neuman, Chace Crawford as Kevin Moskowitz / The Deep, Jessie T. Usher as Reginald "Reggie" Franklin / A-Train, Antony Starr as John / Homelander, Jack Quaid as Hugh "Hughie" Campbell, and Nathan Mitchell as Earving / Black Noir, with Jim Beaver and Giancarlo Esposito making brief vocal appearances as their respective characters Robert "Dakota Bob" Singer and Stanford "Stan" Edgar. Footage of Miles Gaston Villanueva, Nick Wechsler, Laurie Holden, Brett Geddes, and Abigail Whitney as Alex / Drummer Boy / Supersonic, Blue Hawk, the Crimson Countess, Termite, and Moonshadow is also used ahead of their respective debuts as the characters in the third season of The Boys and Gen V.

Production
Matthew Edison starred as Cameron Coleman (a parody of Tucker Carlson and J. K. Simmons' Marvel Cinematic Universe (MCU) portrayal of J. Jonah Jameson), with the majority of The Boys main cast reprising their roles in a guest capacity in the series. Amazon Prime Video had its chief marketing group creative director Matt Motschenbacher write-direct the videos, which follow Coleman as he commentates on the immediate aftermath of the second season of The Boys, and the buildup to the series' third season, while featuring numerous easter eggs to the wider VCU, including such events such as the pursuit of Cindy (a parody of Stranger Things Eleven) by Black Noir. In addition to archive footage from the first two seasons, the videos also use original material, in particular music videos and footage intended to set up the events of both the series' third season and the spin-off Gen V, with Amazon Prime Video officially announcing the series as:

“Seven on 7 on VNN [Vought News Network] [is] a news program set within the universe of “The Boys” that is intended to “bridge the gap” between Seasons 2 and 3. VNN’s episodes of Seven on 7 will be released the 7th of every month and each will have 7 stories per episode plus a commercial. Additionally, the VNN anchor Cameron Coleman, portrayed by Matthew Edison, will also be a VNN anchor in Season 3 of the series. VNN episodes will be an anchor series for the newly launched, wholly in-world channels @VoughtINTL on YouTube, Instagram and Twitter. Everything posted to @VoughtINTL does not break the fourth wall and remains entirely in the world of The Boys,’ even as real-world and in-world blend and overlap in fun, surprising ways.”

Intended to be a "takedown of conservative news television", The Boys showrunner and Seven on 7 writer Eric Kripke further described the series to Entertainment Weekly as:

"Since the very start of The Boys, we've seen Vought's propaganda arm — I mean, news channel — VNN, [and] We'll be digging deeper into those fair and balanced patriots next season, so as a teaser, we're introducing Seven on 7 with VNN's biggest star Cameron Coleman. The episodes are in-world canon, serving up brand-new information that bridges the story gap between season 2 and 3. So enjoy the hot takes and catheter commercials, just like your parents do!"

Release
The first season was made available on the "Vought International" YouTube channel, with some of them debuting in publications such as IGN and Twitter, and as bonus features on the Amazon Prime Video streaming service on which The Boys and its spin-offs air.

Reception

Critical response
Danielle Ryan of Slash Film praised the "bitingly funny faux-Fox News" nature of Seven on 7, describing it as "satirized to the fullest" and "close to being as entertaining as the series itself, and that's truly saying something", while Craig Elvy of Screen Rant described the series as "a hilarious expansion of The Boys fictional world", complimenting Matthew Edison's portrayal of Cameron Coleman as a "Tucker Carlson-esque figure" and expressing interest in Edison reprising their role in The Boys. Following Edison's subsequent third season portrayal of the character, Elvy further praised Edison's portrayal of Cameron for having "carved an unexpectedly strong impression into The Boys landscape", with "Edison's note-perfect news host parody [being] both hilarious and socially cutting, and his deadpan delivery bring[ing] a style of humor missing from The Boys comedic palette in seasons 1 & 2", serving as "[m]ore than just comic relief [with] buckets of storyline potential".

Notes

References

External links
 Vought News Network: Seven on 7 with Cameron Coleman on YouTube
 

The Boys (franchise)
2021 web series debuts
Amazon Prime Video original programming
American superhero television series
Dynamite Entertainment adaptations
Fictional television shows
Television shows based on DC Comics
Viral marketing